Pirates Voyage Dinner and Show is a dinner theater located in Myrtle Beach, South Carolina. Pirates Voyage is owned by entertainer Dolly Parton and managed by World Choice Investments LLC, a joint venture between The Dollywood Company, Fred Hardwick, and Herschend Family Entertainment Corporation.

On September 22, 2010, Parton announced the Myrtle Beach theater would close for refurbishment after 18 years service as the Dixie Stampede show for conversion to a pirate themed show. The new show features Blackbeard, a pirate with a history along the North and South Carolina coasts. During November and December, the show includes Christmas elements

References

Tourist attractions in Myrtle Beach, South Carolina